is a Prefectural Natural Park in eastern Hyōgo Prefecture, Japan. Established in 1958, the park spans the municipalities of Asago, Taka, and Tamba.

See also
 National Parks of Japan

References

External links
  Map of Asago Gunzan Prefectural Natural Park

Parks and gardens in Hyōgo Prefecture
Protected areas established in 1958
1958 establishments in Japan